Thaumaturgis is a monotypic moth genus in the family Gelechiidae. Its single species, Thaumaturgis craterocrossa, is found in South Africa. Both the genus and species were first described by Edward Meyrick in 1934.

References

Endemic moths of South Africa
Gelechiinae